March 15 - Eastern Orthodox liturgical calendar - March 17

All fixed commemorations below are observed on March 29 by Orthodox Churches on the Old Calendar.

For March 16th, Orthodox Churches on the Old Calendar commemorate the Saints listed on March 3.

Saints

 Apostle Aristobulus of the Seventy, Bishop of Britain (1st century)  (see also: March 15 and October 31)
 Hieromartyr Alexander I, Pope of Rome (c. 115)
 Hieromartyrs Eventius and Theodoulus, Presbyters of the Church of Rome, martyred alongside Pope Alexander of Rome (c. 117-138)
 Holy Ten Martyrs of Phoenicia, by the sword.
 Martyr Sabinus of Hermopolis, Egypt (287)
 Hieromartyrs Trophimus and Thalus, Priests of Laodicea (300)
 Martyr Papas of Lycaonia (305)  (see also: September 14)
 Martyr Julian of Anazarbus, in Cilicia (305)
 Venerable Aninas of Mesopotamia the Wonderworker. (see also: March 18)
 Hieromartyr Romanos, at Parium on the Hellespont.

Pre-Schism Western saints

 Martyrs Hilary of Aquileia and Tatian the Deacon, with Felix, Largus and Denis, under Numerian (c. 284)
 Saint Agapitus, Bishop of Ravenna (4th century)
 Saint Finian Lobhar, Abbot of Swords Abbey near Dublin (c. 560)
 Saint Abbán of Kilabban, Ireland (650)
 Saint Eusebia, Abbess at Hamay-les-Marchiennes near Arras, France (c. 680)
 Saint Dentlin (Dentelin, Denain), child-saint, considered a confessor of the faith (7th century)
 Venerable John of Rufiana, ascetic of the Monasterium Rufianense (San Pedro de Montes), near Astorga, Spain.
 Saint Megingold von Rothenburg (Megingaud, Mengold, Megingoz), Bishop of Würzburg (794)
 Saint Gregory Makar, a monk who was elected Bishop of Nicopolis in Armenia, then fled to France and settled as a hermit in Pithiviers near Orleans (c. 1000)
 Saint Heribert of Cologne, Archbishop of Cologne (1021)

Post-Schism Orthodox saints

 Venerable Christodoulos, Wonderworker of Patmos (1093) 
 Venerable Pimen of Salosi, Fool-for-Christ, Enlightener of the Dagestani (North Caucasus people), and his companion Anthony of Meskhi, Georgia, the Censurer of Kings (13th century)
 New Monk-martyr Malachi of Rhodes, who suffered at Jerusalem (1500)
 Saint Serapion of Novgorod, Archbishop of Novgorod (1516)
 Saint Ambrose (Khelaia) the Confessor, Catholicos-Patriarch of All Georgia (1927)  (see also: March 27)
 Venerable Eutropia (Isayenkova) of Kherson, clairvoyant (1968)

Icon gallery

Notes

References

Sources
 March 16/March 29. Orthodox Calendar (PRAVOSLAVIE.RU).
 March 29 / March 16. HOLY TRINITY RUSSIAN ORTHODOX CHURCH (A parish of the Patriarchate of Moscow).
 Complete List of Saints. Protection of the Mother of God Church (POMOG).
 March 16. OCA - The Lives of the Saints.
 The Autonomous Orthodox Metropolia of Western Europe and the Americas (ROCOR). St. Hilarion Calendar of Saints for the year of our Lord 2004. St. Hilarion Press (Austin, TX). p. 22.
 March 16. Latin Saints of the Orthodox Patriarchate of Rome.
 The Roman Martyrology. Transl. by the Archbishop of Baltimore. Last Edition, According to the Copy Printed at Rome in 1914. Revised Edition, with the Imprimatur of His Eminence Cardinal Gibbons. Baltimore: John Murphy Company, 1916. pp. 77–78.
Greek Sources
 Great Synaxaristes:  16 ΜΑΡΤΙΟΥ. ΜΕΓΑΣ ΣΥΝΑΞΑΡΙΣΤΗΣ.
  Συναξαριστής. 16 Μαρτίου. ECCLESIA.GR. (H ΕΚΚΛΗΣΙΑ ΤΗΣ ΕΛΛΑΔΟΣ). 
Russian Sources
  29 марта (16 марта). Православная Энциклопедия под редакцией Патриарха Московского и всея Руси Кирилла (электронная версия). (Orthodox Encyclopedia - Pravenc.ru).
  16 марта (ст.ст.) 29 марта 2013 (нов. ст.). Русская Православная Церковь Отдел внешних церковных связей. (DECR).

March in the Eastern Orthodox calendar